Franciszek Maksymilian Pieczka (18 January 1928 – 23 September 2022) was a Polish actor. A graduate of the National Higher School of Theatre in Warsaw (1954), he first made his debut in the theatre in Jelenia Góra. He won the award for Best Actor at the Polish Film Festival in 1976 for The Scar. 

In 2015, he was awarded the Polish Academy Life Achievement Award.

Biography 
Franciszek Pieczka was born and raised in Godów. He was the youngest of six siblings.

After World War II, he studied acting. A graduate of the Aleksander Zelwerowicz National Academy of Dramatic Art in Warsaw. He made his debut at the Dolnośląski Theater in Jelenia Góra. Then he moved to the Ludowy Theatre in Nowa Huta, where he performed in the years 1955–1964. In 1974–2015, he was an actor of the Powszechny Theater in Warsaw. 

He has starred in over a hundred films, both Polish and foreign. He has been awarded and honored many times for his individual roles, as well as his contribution to the development of theater and film art. Franciszek Pieczka is an honorary citizen of the Godów commune.

In 2016, he supported the fight against smog in his hometown of Upper Silesia, appearing in a film clip entitled Nie truj sąsiada! recorded together with the city of Wodzisław Śląski.

On 11 November 2017, he was awarded the highest Polish state decoration, the Order of the White Eagle.

Pieczka died on 23 September 2022, at the age of 94.

Filmography

 Matka Joanna od Aniołów (1960)
 Kwiecień (1961)
 Drugi brzeg (1962)
 Zacne grzechy (1963)
 Rękopis znaleziony w Saragossie (1964)
 Czterej pancerni i pies (1966-1970) as Gustlik
 Żywot Mateusza (1968) as Mateusz
 Hydrozagadka (1970)
 Liberation (1970)
 Perła w koronie (1971)
 Wesele (1972) as Czepiec
 Ziemia obiecana (1974)
 Potop (1974) as old Kiemlicz
 Budapest Tales (1976)
 The Scar (1976)
  (1978)
 Jadup and Boel (1980)
 Ród Gąsieniców (1981)
 Austeria (1982) as Tag
 Blisko coraz bliżej (1982)
 Konopielka (1982)
 Axiliad (1986)
 The Mother of Kings (1987)
 Memories of a River (1990)
 God afton, Herr Wallenberg (1990)
 Burial of a Potato (1990)
 Jańcio Wodnik (1993) 
 Johnnie Waterman (1994)
 Thanks for Every New Morning (1994)
 Szabla od komendanta (1995)
 Historia kina w Popielawach (1998)
 Syzyfowe prace (1998)
 Quo Vadis (2001) as Saint Peter
 Jasminum (2006)
 Ranczo (2007-2016)

References

External links

 
 Franciszek Pieczka at the Internet Polish Movie Database 

1928 births
2022 deaths
People from Wodzisław Śląski
People from the Province of Upper Silesia
People from Wodzisław County
Polish male film actors
Polish film actors
Polish male stage actors
Polish male television actors
20th-century Polish male actors
Grand Crosses of the Order of Polonia Restituta
Recipients of the Gold Cross of Merit (Poland)
Recipients of the Gold Medal for Merit to Culture – Gloria Artis
21st-century Polish male actors
Aleksander Zelwerowicz National Academy of Dramatic Art in Warsaw alumni
Recipient of the Meritorious Activist of Culture badge